Diargon or the argon dimer is a molecule containing two argon atoms. Normally, this is only very weakly bound together by van der Waals forces (a van der Waals molecule). However, in an excited state, or ionised state, the two atoms can be more tightly bound together, with significant spectral features. At cryogenic temperatures, argon gas can have a few percent of diargon molecules.

Theory

Two argon atoms are attracted together by van der Waals forces when far from each other. When they are close, electrostatic forces repel them. There is a balance point where the van der Waals force matches the opposing repelling force, where energy is at a minimum, represented as the trough in the graph of interaction energy versus distance. This distance is the ground state of the unexcited argon dimer. In a vibrating molecule, the distance between the atoms bounces backwards and forwards from one side of the trough to the other. Faster vibrations will force the state up to higher levels in the energy trough.  If the vibration is too much the molecule will break up. In a rotating molecule, the centrifugal force drags the atoms apart, but can still be overcome by the attractive force. But if the rotation is too much the atoms break apart.

Properties
The ionisation energy of the neutral molecule is 14.4558 eV (or 116593 cm−1).

The dissociation energy of neutral Ar2 in the ground state is 98.7 cm−1 which is hundreds of times weaker than that of typical molecules. The dissociation energy of Ar2+ is 1.3144 eV or 10601 cm−1.

The Ar2 molecule can exist in a number of different vibration and rotational states. If the molecule is not rotating, there are eight different vibration states. But if the molecule spins fast, vibration is more likely to shake it apart, and at the 30th rotational level there are only two stable and one metastable state of vibration. In combination, there are 170 different possibilities that are stable. In the metastable states, energy will be released if the molecule breaks apart into two separate atoms, but some extra energy is required to overcome the attraction between the atoms. Quantum tunneling can result in the molecule breaking apart with no extra energy. However this takes time, which can vary from 10−11 seconds to several centuries. Molecules crashing into each other also results in breakup of the van der Waals molecules. At standard conditions this only takes about 100 picoseconds.

Excited states

Neutral
99.6% of the argon isotopes are 40Ar, so the spectrum observed in natural argon dimer will be due to the 40Ar40Ar isotopomer. The following table lists different excited states.

Cation

References

Extra references

Parson, J.M.; Siska, P.E.; Lee, Y.T., Intermolecular potentials from crossed-beam differential elastic scattering measurements. IV. Ar + Ar, J. Chem. Phys., 1972, 56, 1511.
LeRoy, R.J., Improved spectroscopic dissociation energy for ground-state Ar2, J. Chem. Phys., 1972, 57, 573. 
Present, R.D., Collision diameter and well depth of the Ar-Ar interaction, J. Chem. Phys., 1973, 58, 2659. 
Wilkinson, P.G., Absorption spectrum of argon in the 1070–1135 Å region, Can. J. Phys., 1968, 46, 315.
Tanaka, Y.; Yoshino, K., Absorption spectrum of the argon molecule in the vacuum-UV region, J. Chem. Phys., 1970, 53, 2012.
Colbourn, E.A.; Douglas, A.E., The spectrum and ground state potential curve of Ar2, J. Chem. Phys., 1976, 65, 1741.
Huffman, R.E.; Larrabee, J.C.; Tanaka, Y., Rare gas continuum light sources for photoelectric scanning in the vacuum ultraviolet, Appl. Opt., 1965, 4, 1581.
Wilkinson, P.G., The mechanism of the argon emission continuum in the vacuum ultraviolet. I, Can. J. Phys., 1967, 45, 1715.
Tanaka, Y., Continuous emission spectra of rare gases in the vacuum ultraviolet region, J. Opt. Soc. Am., 1955, 45, 710. 
Strickler, T.D.; Arakawa, E.T., Optical emission from argon excited by alpha particles: quenching studies, J. Chem. Phys., 1964, 41, 1783.
Verkhovtseva, E.T.; Fogel, Ya.M.; Osyka, V.S., On the continuous spectra of inert gases in the vacuum-ultraviolet region obtained by means of a gas-jet source, Opt. Spectrosc. Engl. Transl., 1968, 25, 238, In original 440. 
Hurst, G.S.; Bortner, T.E.; Strickler, T.D., Proton excitation of the argon atom, Phys. Rev., 1969, 178, 4.
Tanaka, Y.; Jursa, A.S.; LeBlanc, F.J., Continuous emission spectra of rare gases in the vacuum ultraviolet region. II. Neon and helium, J. Opt. Soc. Am., 1958, 48, 304. Michaelson, R.C.; Smith, A.L., Potential curves from emission continua. IV. The upper state of the vacuum uv contiua of Ar2, J. Chem. Phys., 1974, 61, 2566. [all data]
Morgan, C.E.; Frommhold, L., Raman spectra of van der Waals dimers in argon, Phys. Rev. Lett., 1972, 29, 1053.
Frommhold, L.; Bain, R., Comments concerning the "Raman spectra of van der Waals dimers in argon", J. Chem. Phys., 1975, 63, 1700.
Cavallini, M.; Gallinaro, G.; Meneghetti, L.; Scoles, G.; Valbusa, U., Rainbow scattering and the intermolecular potential of argon, Chem. Phys. Lett., 1970, 7, 303.
Barker, J.A.; Fisher, R.A.; Watts, R.O., Liquid argon: Monte Carlo and molecular dynamics calculations, Mol. Phys., 1971, 21, 657.
Maitland, G.C.; Smith, E.B., The intermolecular pair potential of argon, Mol. Phys., 1971, 22, 861.
Present, R.D., Collision diameter and well depth of the Ar-Ar interaction, J. Chem. Phys., 1973, 58, 2659.  
Photoionization of Ar2 at high resolution The Journal of Chemical Physics 76, 1263 (1982); https://doi.org/10.1063/1.443144 P. M. Dehmer
spectrum 800 to 850Å
 Ab initio pair potential energy curve for the argon atom pair and thermophysical properties for the dilute argon gas. II. Thermophysical properties for low-density argon Eckhard Vogel, Benjamin Jäger, Robert Hellmann & Eckard Bich Pages 3335–3352  Published 07 Oct 2010 https://doi.org/10.1080/00268976.2010.507557 (will use the formula and draw graph)
Accurate ab initio potential for argon dimer including highly repulsive region Konrad Patkowski, Garold Murdachaew, Cheng-Ming Fou & Krzysztof Szalewicz Pages 2031–2045  Accepted 12 Sep 2004, Published online: 21 Feb 2007 https://doi.org/10.1080/00268970500130241 
The spectrum and ground state potential curve of Ar2 The Journal of Chemical Physics 65, 1741 (1976); https://doi.org/10.1063/1.433319 E. A. Colbourn and A. E. Douglas
The intermolecular pair potential of argon G.C. Maitland & E.B. Smith Pages 861–868 | Received 27 Oct 1971  https://doi.org/10.1080/00268977100103181  Molecular Physics An International Journal at the Interface Between Chemistry and Physics Volume 22, 1971 – Issue 5 
The Journal of Chemical Physics > Volume 61, Issue 8 Interpretation of Raman spectra of van der Waals dimers in argon The Journal of Chemical Physics 61, 2996 (1974); https://doi.org/10.1063/1.1682453 Lothar Frommhold
Volume 23, Issue 5, May 1980, Pages 499–502 Journal of Quantitative Spectroscopy and Radiative Transfer On the Hulburt-Hirschfelder potential function for the Ar2 molecule Swadesh Kumar Ghoshal; Sankar Sengupta https://doi.org/10.1016/0022-4073(80)90052-7
Volume 71, Issue 4 > 10.1063/1.438529 Emission spectrum of rare gas dimers in the vacuum UV region. II. Rotational analysis of band system I of Ar2 The Journal of Chemical Physics 71, 1780 (1979); https://doi.org/10.1063/1.438529 D. E. Freeman, K. Yoshino, and Y. Tanakam (1073.5–1081.5 Å)
Imaging of the Structure of the Argon and Neon Dimer, Trimer, and Tetramer B. Ulrich, A. Vredenborg, A. Malakzadeh†, L. Ph. H. Schmidt, T. Havermeier, M. Meckel†, K. Cole, M. Smolarski‡, Z. Chang, T. Jahnke, and R. Dörner J. Phys. Chem. A, 2011, 115 (25), pp 6936–6941 DOI: 10.1021/jp1121245 http://citeseerx.ist.psu.edu/viewdoc/download?doi=10.1.1.661.7525&rep=rep1&type=pdf
Experimental evidence for two decay channels in electron impact ionization and fragmentation of argon dimer Elias Jabbour Al Maalouf1, Xueguang Ren2,3, Alexander Dorn2 and Stephan Denifl Journal of Physics: Conference Series, Volume 635, Lepton – Molecule and Small Cluster http://iopscience.iop.org/article/10.1088/1742-6596/635/7/072062/pdf
Raman studies of argon dimers in a supersonic expansion. I. Spectroscopy H. P. Godfried and Isaac F. Silvera Phys. Rev. A 27, 3008 – Published 1 June 1983https://pure.uva.nl/ws/files/2168366/46711_214418y.pdf https://doi.org/10.1103/PhysRevA.27.3008
Observation of dissociative recombination of Ne+2 and Ar+2 directly to the ground state of the product atoms G. B. Ramos, M. Schlamkowitz, J. Sheldon, K. A. Hardy, and J. R. Peterson Phys. Rev. A 51, 2945 – Published 1 April 1995 https://doi.org/10.1103/PhysRevA.51.2945
Dissociative recombination studies of Ar+2 by time-of-flight spectroscopy G. B. Ramos, M. Schlamkowitz, J. Sheldon, K. Hardy, and J. R. Peterson Phys. Rev. A 52, 4556 – Published 1 December 1995 https://doi.org/10.1103/PhysRevA.52.4556

Argon compounds
Allotropes
Van der Waals molecules